Josephine Balsamo (a.k.a. Countess Cagliostro) is a fictional character who is the best known antagonist of Arsène Lupin, the notorious gentleman burglar created by Maurice Leblanc.

History 
Josephine Balsamo claims to be Joséphine Pellegrini, born on 29 July 1788 in Palermo, from the notorious Joseph Balsamo, a.k.a. Alessandro Cagliostro, and Joséphine Tascher de la Pagerie, the maiden name of Joséphine de Beauharnais, the future wife of Napoleon. She allegedly somehow achieved eternal youth. Lupin, however, theorizes that this may be nothing more than a ruse, and that she is actually the granddaughter of the first Joséphine Balsamo, who might not be related to Joseph Balsamo at all.

In 1894, a 20-year-old Arsène Lupin came face-to-face with, and eventually became the lover of, Joséphine Balsamo, who had already heard of him and of his reputation. From her, young Lupin learned the four secrets of Queen Marie Antoinette and Cagliostro:
1) ALCOR, or the Seven-Armed Candlestick;
2) The Hollow Needle;
3) The God-Stone of the King of Bohemia; and
4) In Robore Fortuna.

In 1899, after the death in childbirth of Clarisse d'Etigues, Lupin's wife, the baby son, Jean, was kidnapped by men working for Joséphine Balsamo.

In 1918, Joséphine Balsamo died in Corsica, but not without having put in motion a diabolical plan of revenge.

In 1924, Lupin finally stumbled upon his son Jean, now called Felicien Charles, who had been framed for a crime he did not commit, then was pitted against his father by Joséphine's former henchmen. In the end, Lupin saved his son, but did not tell him that he was his father.

Speculation
Wold Newton family scholar Jean-Marc Lofficier has theorized that the first Joséphine Balsamo had an affair with the norious criminal Henri de Belcamp, a.k.a. John Devil, whose story was recorded in the eponymous book by Paul Féval, père as part of his chronicles Les Habits Noirs and recently continued by Brian Stableford.

From that union was born a daughter, Joséphine Balsamo II, who led a criminal career under the alias of Félina de Cambure, whose exploits were recorded in the eponymous work by Frédéric Soulié.

Joséphine II (Félina) in turn had a liaison with Roland Richmond de Valgeneuse, a.k.a. Salvator, whose exploits were recorded by Alexandre Dumas in Les Mohicans de Paris.

Roland and Joséphine II had twins: Joseph, who was adopted as Joseph Fippart and grew up to become the notorious Rocambole, and Joséphine III. Scholar Rick Lai has theorized that Joséphine III was killed by a gangster working for Théophraste Lupin, Arsène Lupin's father.

As for the identity of the father of Joséphine IV — the one who fought Arsène Lupin — some claim it was William Clayton. Philip José Farmer (inventor of this particular Sir William Clayton as a fictional hero of as-yet-unpublished tales) does not claim this himself: in his book Doc Savage: His Apocalyptic Life (p. 230), he claims Clayton in his old age had an affair with the youthful Josephine. This does not seem plausible, given the chronology he is using and he uses the liaison as the parentage for the character John Clay, the man behind the Red-Headed League in the Sherlock Holmes story. This contradicts what is said about that character in that story.

Bibliography
Joséphine Balsamo was first introduced in the novel La Comtesse de Cagliostro (The Countess of Cagliostro in English) serialized in Le Journal in 1923-24 and collected in book for by Pierre Lafitte in 1924. She returned (posthumously) in La Cagliostro se venge (The Revenge of The Countess of Cagliostro), serialized in Le Journal in 1934 and collected in book form by Laffite in 1935. The two books were translated by Jean-Marc Lofficier and Randy Lofficier for a 2010 omnibus volume, Arsene Lupin vs Countess Cagliostro (Black Coat Press), which includes a new short story by the Lofficiers relating the circumstances of Joséphine's death.

Joséphine Balsamo has since appeared in the anthology of literary pastiches, Tales of the Shadowmen.

Her daughter has appeared in Jean-Marc Lofficier, Randy Lofficier and Gil Formosa's trilogy of graphic novels based on the character of Robur the Conqueror. She hates Robur, who is, in fact, Joseph Balsamo, her ancestor. Robur said her mother killed his friend D'Andrézy, who is, in fact, Arsène Lupin.

In other media
Joséphine Balsamo was played by Kristin Scott Thomas in the 2004 film Arsène Lupin.

Characters in pulp fiction
Literary characters introduced in 1923
Characters in French novels of the 20th century
Fictional counts and countesses
Alessandro Cagliostro
Arsène Lupin